NVC community U19 (Thelypteris limbosperma - Blechnum spicant community) is one of the calcifugous grassland communities in the British National Vegetation Classification system.

It is a widespread but local community. There are no subcommunities.

Community composition

The following constant species are found in this community:
 Lemon-scented fern (Thelypteris limbosperma)
 Hard fern (Blechnum spicant)
 Tormentil (Potentilla erecta)
 Heath bedstraw (Galium saxatile)
 Wood sorrel (Oxalis acetosella)

The Rare species Hymenophyllum wilsonii is known to be associated with the community.

Distribution

This community is widespread but local in the uplands of Wales, England and Scotland.

Subcommunities

There are no subcommunities.

References

 Rodwell, J. S. (1992) British Plant Communities Volume 3 - Grasslands and montane communities  (hardback),  (paperback)

Further reading

Averis, A. et al. (2004). An Illustrated Guide to British Upland Vegetation. Joint Nature Conservation Committee. Peterborough.

U19